A spinto soprano (also lirico-spinto, spinto lyric soprano, or pushed lyric) is a type of operatic soprano voice that has the limpidity and easy high notes of a lyric soprano, yet can be "pushed" on to achieve dramatic climaxes without strain. This type of voice may possess a somewhat darker timbre, too, than the average lyric soprano. It generally uses squillo to "slice" through the sound of a full orchestra, rather than singing over the orchestra like a true dramatic soprano.

Spinto sopranos are also expected to handle dynamic changes in the music that they are performing with skill and poise. They command a vocal range extending from approximately middle C (C4) to in alt D (D6).

The spinto repertoire includes many roles written by Verdi, by the various verismo composers, and by Puccini. Some of these roles are extremely popular with opera audiences. Certain Wagnerian heroines such as Elsa, Elisabeth and Sieglinde are also sung by spinto sopranos. The fact that spinto sopranos are uncommon means that parts that are ideal for their voices are often performed by singers from other classifications, and more than a few lyric sopranos have damaged their voices singing heavier spinto roles.

The spinto tenor is the spinto soprano's male equivalent among operatic voice types.

Spinto roles

See also
 Spinto
 Soprano
Dramatic soprano

References

Further reading

 
Voice types
Italian opera terminology

de:Lyrischer Sopran
fr:Soprano#Soprano lyrique